Schwedler is a surname. Notable people with the surname include:

Alex von Schwedler (born 1980), Chilean footballer
Johann Wilhelm Schwedler (1823– 1894), German civil engineer and civil servant
Karl Schwedler (1902–1970), German singer and leader of the Nazi propaganda jazz band Charlie and His Orchestra
Viktor von Schwedler (1885–1954), German general in the Wehrmacht of Nazi Germany
Willy Schwedler (1894–1945), German footballer

References